99 Souls are a British house duo. They are best known for their 2015 single "The Girl Is Mine", a mash-up of Destiny's Child's "Girl" and Brandy and Monica's "The Boy Is Mine". The single peaked at number five on the UK Singles Chart in January 2016.

Career

2014–present: Breakthrough
In 2014, they released the single "The Girl Is Mine", which is a mash-up of Destiny's Child's "Girl" and Brandy and Monica's "The Boy Is Mine". The song was re-released on 6 November 2015 with Beyoncé's consent and a re-recorded vocal from Brandy. The song peaked at number five on the UK Singles Chart.

Discography

Singles

Awards and nominations

References

British house music duos
British DJs